Arthur Benjamin Williams Jr. (born 1935) is a retired bishop of the Episcopal Diocese of Ohio.

See also
 List of Episcopal bishops of the United States
 Historical list of the Episcopal bishops of the United States

References

External links 
The Rt. Rev. Arthur Williams

Living people
1935 births
Episcopal bishops of Ohio